Filip Renč (born 17 August 1965) is a Czech film director, screenwriter, and actor.

Biograph
Filip Renč was born in Prague, Czechoslovakia. Since his childhood, he already proved his enthusiasm for movies and drama. As a young boy he appeared in several movies, including Julek (1980) and Leve kridlo (1983). During his studies at FAMU (Film and TV School of The Academy of Performing Arts in Prague) he created documentaries (Zapadákov, Srdíčko) for which he was awarded at the International film schools festival in 1987 and 1988. His debut movie Requiem for a Maiden was also a great success at the Czechoslovakian film festival FORUM in Bratislava. In the following years he directed a number of successful movies, including From Subway with Love (2005) and his latest piece At Your Own Risk (2008) which has just recently been released. He directed not only movies but also TV commercials and even music videos. He also wrote screenplays which he later directed himself, such as The Rebels (2001), Válka barev (1993) and Requiem for a Maiden (1991). Filip Renč made numerous appearances as an actor, for an instance, in The Ride (1991) and even his own Requiem for a Maiden (1991).

Achievements
Renč achieved great success with his movie Rebelové. In 2001, he won the Bonton Company Award and the Children's Jury Main Prize in the Feature Film - Youth category with this movie. The Rebels also won him the Audience Award in the Most Popular Film category and Filip Renč was nominated together with Daniel Dvořák for Best Art Direction at the Czech Lion awards. His movie adaptation of Michal Viewegh's From Subway with Love (original title Román pro ženy), was also well received by critics and by the public. In 2006, the movie From Subway with Love received two nominations - for the Best Film Poster and for the Best Supporting Actress (Simona Stašová) at the Czech Lion Awards. This movie also won Filip Renč the Box Office Award in the same year.

Filmography

Direction
 2016 The Devil's Mistress
 2008 Guard No. 47
 2008 At Your Own Risk
 2005 From Subway with Love
 2001 Rebelové
 1999 Polojasno
 1993 Válka barev
 1991 Requiem pro panenku

Screenplays
 2001   Rebelové
 1993   Válka barev
 1991   Requiem for a Maiden

Acting
 2007   Empties
 2001   Dark Blue World
 1996   Kolya
 1991   The Ride
 1991   Reqiuem for a Maiden
 1986   Papilio
 1983   The Wanderings of Jan Amos
 1980   Julek
 1978   Leave Me Alone (Nechci nic slyšet)

References
 Czech-Slovak Film Database
 Osobnosti.cz
 The Internet Movie Database

Living people
1965 births
Film directors from Prague
Male actors from Prague
Recipients of Medal of Merit (Czech Republic)
Academy of Performing Arts in Prague alumni